Pauline K. Gubbels (born January 5, 1936) was an American politician who served in the New Mexico House of Representatives. She represented the 30th district from 1995 until her resignation in November 2002. Her district was in Bernalillo County. She previously served on the Albuquerque City Council from 1989 to 1993.

Gubbels received her BS from the University of Texas and her MS from Purdue University. She and her husband, Matt, have six children.

References

1936 births
Living people
Republican Party members of the New Mexico House of Representatives
Women state legislators in New Mexico
20th-century American politicians
20th-century American women politicians
21st-century American politicians
21st-century American women politicians
University of Texas alumni
Purdue University alumni